The 2017 Moscow municipal elections took place in Moscow on 10 September 2017. Elections took place for deputies of the municipal councils in 124 of 125 districts of Moscow and in one administrative okrug, for a total of 1,502 seats, which were contested by around 7,500 candidates. The voter turnout was 14.82%. Although the post of municipal council member is relatively powerless, candidates for mayor of Moscow are required to obtain support from municipal deputies to stand in elections.

While United Russia gained the majority with 1,153 seats, the Communist Party of the Russian Federation (KPRF) was replaced in second place by the liberal opposition party Yabloko with 176 seats. The Communist Party only received 44 seats, while 108 went to independents, ten to A Just Russia, five to the Party of Growth, four to the Liberal Democratic Party of Russia (LDPR), and two to the People's Freedom Party (PARNAS). Because of the large number of seats that went to opposition parties and independents, and the fact that in several districts they obtained the majority, the elections were regarded as progress for the liberal opposition in Russia. Dmitry Gudkov, opposition politician and former member the State Duma who organized the effort to get opposition candidates on the municipal councils, stated that "our victory wasn't complete, but it is a victory."

Results

Overview

In multiple districts in the center of Moscow as well as some on the periphery of the city, the ruling party United Russia suffered defeats to opposition candidates, who in total received a combined total of nearly 20% of the seats. The opposition had formed a coalition called 'United Democrats' to get candidates elected to municipal councils of deputies.
In seven districts of the city, not a single United Russia candidate was elected.
In 25 districts United Russia deputies formed a minority in the local council.
In five districts the opposition and United Russia received an equal number of seats.
In the Gagarinsky District, where President Vladimir Putin voted, twelve out of the twelve seats went to members of the liberal party Yabloko. In the Tverskoy District, where the Moscow Kremlin is located, Yabloko received ten of the twelve seats.

Dmitry Gudkov stated after the municipal election that his intent was to run for mayor of Moscow in the 2018 election, but Yabloko did not pass the minimum requirement for the municipal filter, according to Moscow Election Commission.

By district
Listed in Russian alphabetical order:

References

2017 elections in Russia
Local elections in Russia
Elections in Moscow
2017 in Moscow
September 2017 events in Russia